Anthony Meyer may refer to:
 Anthony Meyer (actor) (born 1947), English actor
 Sir Anthony Meyer, 3rd Baronet (1920–2004), British politician
 Anthony (Tony) E. Meyer (born 1961), American entrepreneur, investor and philanthropist